The Mississippi Enterprise was one of two African-American newspapers in Jackson, Mississippi. Arrington High worked at the paper. Publication years include 1939–1980. The paper covered lynchings and murders of African Americans. It advocated for African Americans to support African-American businesses in Mound Bayou, Mississippi, a historically African-American community founded by freed slaves. The Library of Congress has an archive of the paper.

It was one of five African-American newspapers in Mississippi in the 1950s.

See also
Jackson Advocate

References

External links
 On Newspapers.com
 
 

Defunct African-American newspapers
Defunct newspapers published in Mississippi
Jackson, Mississippi